The spotted blue-eye (Pseudomugil gertrudae) is a species of fish in the family Pseudomugilidae. It is native to Papua New Guinea and northern Australia. It adapts readily to captivity and can be kept in a small freshwater aquarium.

Taxonomy
Max Carl Wilhelm Weber described Pseudomugil gertrudae in 1911 from specimens collected from Trangan Island in the Aru Islands, naming it in honour of Gertrude, the wife of Dr. Hugo Merton, who visited the islands in 1907–08. Common names include spotted blue-eye, delicate blue-eye, Gertrude's blue-eye, and northern blue-eye.

Description
The spotted blue-eye has an elongated body generally up to 2.5 cm (1 in), or rarely 3 cm (1.2 in)  in length. The overall colour is transparent to pale silver-white, sometimes with tints of tan or yellow. The rear half of the body is marked with three horizontal black lines, breaking up into spots anteriorly. The fins are yellow with black markings. Body size, colour and shape vary across its range: fish from the Aru Islands are larger, those from the vicinity of Darwin have orange pectoral fins, while fish from Goanna Lagoon in Arnhem Land have an orange body.

Distribution and habitat
The spotted blue-eye is found in rivers in southern New Guinea, the Aru Islands, and the Northern Territory and Cape York Peninsula (Queensland) in Australia. Their habitat includes small slow-moving streams, often less than 60 cm (2 ft) deep, pools, and Melaleuca or Pandanus swamps. They have been found in water of pH 3.68 to 9.4.

Feeding
Though its diet has been little-studied, algae and small invertebrates make up a large part of it.

Breeding
Though little is known of its reproductive behaviour in the wild, the spotted blue-eye breeds readily in captivity.

References

spotted blue-eye
Freshwater fish of Papua New Guinea
Freshwater fish of Australia
Fauna of the Northern Territory
Taxa named by Max Carl Wilhelm Weber
spotted blue-eye